Villabraz is a municipality located in the province of León, Castile and León, Spain. According to the 2014 census, the municipality has a population of 110 inhabitants.

Villages
Villabraz
Alcuetas
Fáfilas

See also
Esla-Campos

References

External links

Municipalities in the Province of León